The 1994–95 season was Blackburn Rovers F.C.'s third season in the Premier League, and their third consecutive season in the top division of English football.

The season was marked by the club winning the Premier League title, ending their 81-year run without an English league title. They ended up winning the title by a one-point margin over Manchester United. Rovers led the way for most of the season, but a 2–1 defeat at Kenny Dalglish's old club Liverpool at Anfield on the final day of the season briefly appeared to threaten their title hopes. Manchester United however could only draw 1–1 at West Ham so the league title was back at Blackburn for the first time since 1914.		
Jack Walker's dream had come true: within five years of buying the club, he had taken them from strugglers in the old Second Division to champions of England.	

Early exits from the League Cup, FA Cup and UEFA Cup to Liverpool, Newcastle and Trelleborg respectively were frustrating for Rovers in 1994–95, but turned out for the best as they could concentrate on the league challenge.

Kenny Dalglish won the Premier League Manager of the Year award for leading Blackburn to success, Alan Shearer won both the Golden Boot for contributing 34 of Blackburn's 80 league goals and also the PFA Players' Player of the Year award as nominated by his fellow professionals. Tim Flowers, Graeme Le Saux, Colin Hendry, Tim Sherwood, Chris Sutton and Shearer all made it into the PFA Team of the Year.

Review

August
Blackburn started the campaign with a 1–1 draw away to Southampton; in his debut, Chris Sutton could have been on the score sheet as early as the second minute but fired wide. It was the home side who took the lead, however, when, in the fifteenth minute, Nicky Banger controlled a box-to-box pass from Matt Le Tissier before firing home. A minute later Sutton had the chance to equalise, but this time headed wide from a Graeme Le Saux cross.  Blackburn equalised in the second half when, in the 60th minute, Sutton headed the ball down to Alan Shearer who side-footed the ball past Bruce Grobbelaar.

Blackburn recorded their first victory of the season just three days later at Ewood Park, running out 3–0 winners against Leicester City. Chris Sutton got the first goal and his first for his new club in the 19th minute when he headed in Shearer's delicately flighted chip. Henning Berg doubled the advantage in the 59th minute when he knocked in Sutton's flick on from close range. The points were wrapped up in the 74th minute when Robbie Slater's shot hit the post and fell straight to Shearer, who swept the ball home.

Coventry City were the next visitors, and suffered a similar fate to Leicester, going down 4–0. Chris Sutton netted a hat-trick: the first a header in the 67h minute, the second a right-footed effort in the 74th and finally tapping home from close range after good work by Shearer in the 88th. Jason Wilcox got the other goal with a 20-yard effort that went in off the post.

Blackburn again dropped points, this time in a 0–0 draw away to Arsenal. In a match that was dominated by Arsenal, who were let down by poor finishing, the main talking point was the sending off of Jason Wilcox in the 53rd minute for a second yellow. After defender Colin Hendry was forced off with a head wound, Chris Sutton was called on to play at centre-back, a job he proved to be more than comfortable with.

September
Due to an international break, Rovers' next game was in the second week of September. The match was played at Ewood Park; the opposition, Everton, received the same treatment as previous visitors, leaving home on the back of a 3–0 defeat. Shearer got the first after 17 minutes, latching onto Tim Flowers' clearance before running at the Everton defence and shooting in the bottom left corner. Shearer was the provider for the second just before half time, crossing to the back post for an unmarked Jason Wilcox to blast home, and it was Shearer again who made sure of the points in the 60th minute, converting a penalty after Sutton had been brought down. The match is notable for being the first game to feature Everton's new signing Daniel Amokachi of Nigeria, the first black player at the club in over 20 years. As the score reflected, Amokachi proved no match for the Blackburn defence who seemed to tackle him very easily and he did not threaten goal in the entire match.

Trelleborg (home)

Blackburn bounced back from their European disappointment, winning 2–1 away at Chelsea. Blackburn took the lead through an own goal in the 26th minute and looked likely to score more, but Chelsea equalised in the 56th minute through John Spencer, the first league goal that Blackburn had conceded in seven hours. Just eleven minutes later Chris Sutton headed in Robbie Slater's cross to restore the lead, and from there on in there was only one victor.

Aston Villa were the next visitors to Ewood, and bettered previous opposition by at least scoring, although still going down 3–1. In the 17th minute Sutton was fouled by Ugo Ehiogu and Shearer confidently struck the penalty beyond Mark Bosnich to give Blackburn the lead. The second, in the 55th minute, saw Shearer return the favour when his shot from Stuart Ripley's cross thumped off Ehiogu's chest and Sutton got his toe to it, poking it beyond Bosnich.  The duo combined again for the 71st-minute third goal: Sutton gathered a long clearance from Tim Flowers and laid the pass precisely into Shearer's path, who easily went past Ehiogu to thump a 15-yard shot into the net. The Villa defender did manage to get a consolation goal in injury time.

Trelleborg (away)

October
Following on from their midweek European failure, Blackburn lost their first game away to Norwich City 2–1. Blackburn took the lead and, following his £5m move, inevitably it was Chris Sutton who got the first goal, rolling the ball gently past Bryan Gunn in the fourth minute. Norwich fought back, however, and goals from Mark Bowen and Jon Newsome either side of halftime handed them the win and Blackburn their first league defeat.

Blackburn's title challenge continued to stutter in the next match with a 1–1 away to leaders Newcastle United. Rovers took the lead through a 57th-minute penalty from Shearer after Wilcox had been brought down by Newcastle goalkeeper Pavel Srnicek. Blackburn looked to be leaving with all three points, but Newcastle scrambled an equaliser just two minutes from time: Colin Hendry unintentionally flicked on Scott Sellars' corner and the ball fell to Steve Howey. His shot was cleared off the line by Jason Wilcox, only to rebound into the net off the back of Tim Flowers.

Blackburn returned to winning ways against Liverpool, coming out 3–2 winners in a match between the teams placed third and fourth in the Premiership pre-match. Liverpool took the lead through Robbie Fowler's deflected 30th-minute shot, a lead they kept until halftime. The match was turned on its head soon after halftime when Shearer made two goals with crosses from the right of the area that were touched home by Mark Atkins in the 52nd minute and Sutton in the 57th. The lead did not last long as John Barnes scored an overhead kick from Stig Inge Bjørnebye's cross just two minutes later, but Sutton scored what proved to be the winner in the 73rd minute by blasting in from a tight angle after his first effort was blocked by Neil Ruddock.

Blackburn's unbeaten home League record went the next game when they lost 4–2 to Manchester United. Blackburn took the lead after 13 minutes: Eric Cantona handled on the right touchline and, when Graeme Le Saux's cross entered the area, Peter Schmeichel punched the ball out straight to Paul Warhurst, who returned it with a deft chip off 30 yards into the top of the goal. As Blackburn appeared on the brink of an unbreakable hold, the tone of the match was irretrievably altered when Henning Berg brought down Lee Sharpe in the area. The penalty decision, later shown to be incorrect as Berg had played the ball, was compounded by Berg's sending off. Cantona scored the penalty into the left-hand corner. Blackburn regained the lead after 50 minutes when Colin Hendry scored with a powerful header from Le Saux's cross, but the lead lastly barely a minute as Andrei Kanchelskis broke in from the right and, after his attempt at a cross was blocked by Hendry, the winger pounced on the loose ball and hit a left-foot half-volley past Tim Flowers. After 66 minutes it was 3–2 when Le Saux committed an error playing a ball to the unmarked Mark Hughes, who saw Flowers off his line and delicately chipped over the stranded goalkeeper. Rovers pushed for an equaliser, but Kanchelskis broke away in the 82nd minute to secure the points.

Things didn't get any easier for Blackburn as they then faced an away trip to Nottingham Forest, who were unbeaten and had a 24-game unbeaten record in all competitions. In a hard fought, entertaining competitive match, Blackburn came out 2–0 victors. Sutton gave Blackburn the lead in the eighth minute, capitalising on Forest's failure to clear the ball on the edge of their area by thumping a right-foot shot on the turn. The second goal came from a corner, swung over by Ripley to Shearer, whose apparent mishit on the turn fell neatly for Sutton to smash the ball past Mark Crossley in the 68th minute. Jason Wilcox was sent for two bookable offences — the second, in the 87th minute, for time wasting.

FA Charity Shield

Due to Manchester United completing the Double of Premier League and FA Cup in 1993–94, Blackburn Rovers faced them in the season's annual curtain raiser – the FA Charity Shield, as they finished as runners-up in the 1993–94 Premier League. United won the match 2–0 with goals from Eric Cantona and Paul Ince.

Awards
Despite leading his team to Premier league glory, Kenny Dalglish only won the Premier League Manager of the Month award once. This came in November when he guided Blackburn to four successive wins.
The same month also saw Shearer and Sutton jointly win the Premier League Player of the Month award for "| scoring eight goals between them.

Kenny Dalglish won the Premier League Manager of the Year award for leading Blackburn to title success, Alan Shearer won both the Golden Boot and the PFA Players' Player of the Year award as nominated by his fellow professionals.

Tim Flowers, Graeme Le Saux, Colin Hendry, Tim Sherwood, Sutton and Shearer all made it into the PFA Team of the Year.

Blackburn also provided the opposition when Matt Le Tissier scored the eventual Goal of the Season on 10 December 1994, for his famous lob over old teammate Tim Flowers.

First-team squad

Left club during season

Results

FA Premier League

FA Cup

League Cup

UEFA Cup

Squad stats

Appearances and goals

Starts + substitution appearances

Last Update: 22 January 2010
Data does not include appearances/goals obtained whilst at another club
Substitution appearances in (brackets)
League – Premier League
FA Cup – FA Cup
League Cup – League Cup

Discipline

Transfers

In

Out

Loaned in

Loaned out

References

Blackburn Rovers F.C. seasons
English football championship-winning seasons
Blackburn Rovers F.C.